Several French ships have been called Railleuse
 , a 18-gun frigate
 , a 32-gun  frigate, captured in 1804 and became the Royal Navy prison ship HMS Antigua (1804)
 , a  destroyer launched in 1926
 , a  patrol vessel, decommissioned in 2011

French Navy ship names